Satan Was a Lady is an American 1975 hardcore pornographic film, produced and directed by Doris Wishman, and starring Bree Anthony, Tony Richards, Annie Sprinkle and Bobby Astyr.

Plot

Claudia (Bree Anthony) and Victor (Tony Richards) are engaged to be married. Claudia's sister Terry (Annie Sprinkle) has affairs with Victor and with Bobby (Bobby Astyr) while Victor has another girlfriend on the side (C. J. Laing). Meanwhile, Ada (Sandy Foxx) – Terry's mother and Claudia's stepmother – schemes to cheat Claudia out of her inheritance. In the end, the entire plot is revealed, but not without dire consequences for Claudia.

Cast
 Bree Anthony (Claudia)
 Tony Richards (Victor, billed as Tony Rich)
 Annie Sprinkle (Terry, billed as Anny Sands)
 Bobby Astyr (Bobby, billed as Bobby Astyn)  
 C.J. Laing (Victor's mistress, billed as Chris Jackson)  
 Sandy Foxx (Ada - Terry's mother, billed as Sandi Foxx)  
 Neil Rhodes (Detective)

See also
 List of American films of 1975

References

External links

1975 films
1970s exploitation films
Films directed by Doris Wishman
1970s pornographic films
1970s English-language films
1970s American films